Robin Lawrie is a Scottish-born artist and children's book illustrator. Throughout his career, he has illustrated books by CS Lewis, Prue Leith and Enid Blyton. He has written and illustrated several children's books of his own about building motorways, car mechanics, building kit cars, rally drivers, and mountain biking.

Early Publications 
His early work included books that sought to introduce children to the mechanical processes behind vehicles such as airplanes and cars. His first book Under the bonnet; how cars work and how to keep them working was published by abulard schuman in 1970. The following year Ready for Take-off: How an Aeroplane Flies and How it is Flown was released in the autumn of 1971.

Illustration Styles 
Robin Lawrie has illustrated in several different styles, including black and white line drawings as seen in the 1979 poetry collection Buying a Heart By George Macbeth. He is also known for his pencil and watercolor style found in Dreams: the story of Martin Luther King, Jr  which utilises white space.

Career Highlights 
Robin Lawrie gained notability in the children's book market in 1985 when he illustrated a book of fairy tales by Danish Author Hans Christian Andersen and retold by Robert Mathias. In December 1993 he illustrated an abridged graphic novel edition of CS Lewis's, The Lion the Witch and the Wardrobe for American publishing house: Harper Collins, in the style of an Edwardian Comic Book, framing the pages with decorative borders. Later, in 1994 he illustrated two separate editions of Frances Hodgson Burnet's Children's Novel, The Secret Garden, for Parragon and Puffin publishing respectively. In the same year he also illustrated Peter Pan by Scottish novelist and playwright J. M. Barrie; the cover and illustrations portrayed the lost boys as silhouettes.

Notable works 

 Snow White and the Seven Dwarfs/ illustrated by Robin Lawrie.
 The Wind in The Willows by Kenneth Grahame, illustrated by Robin Lawrie.
 The Secret Garden by Frances Hodgson Burnett, Robin Lawrie (Illustrator)
 Peter Pan by Sir J. M. Barrie (Paperback, 1996)
 A Little Princess By Frances Hodgson Burnett, Robin Lawrie Illustrations.
 A treasury of stories from the Brother's Grim Retold by Jenny Koralek; illustrated by Robin Lawrie.
The Chain Gang Series, in collaboration with his wife Christine Lawrie.

Book Jackets 

 Enid Byton The First Green Goblin.
 Enid Blyton Josie, Click, & Bun & Little Tree House.
 Enid Blyton The Second Green Goblin Book
 Enid Blyton More about Josie Click and bun

References 

Scottish illustrators
Living people
British children's book illustrators
Year of birth missing (living people)